Arias-Stella reaction, also Arias-Stella phenomenon, is a benign change in the endometrium associated with the presence of chorionic tissue.

Arias-Stella reaction is due to progesterone primarily. Cytologically, it looks like a malignancy and, historically, it was diagnosed as endometrial cancer.

Significance 
It is significant only because it can be misdiagnosed as a cancer.  It may be seen in a completely normal pregnancy.

Diagnosis 
It is characterized by nuclear enlargement and may also have any of the following: an irregular nuclear membrane, granular chromatin, centronuclear vacuolization, and pseudonuclear inclusions.

Five subtypes are recognized:
Minimal atypia.
Early secretory pattern.
Secretory or hypersecretory pattern.
Regenerative, proliferative or nonsecretory pattern.
Monstrous cell pattern.

History 
It was first described by Javier Arias Stella, a Peruvian pathologist, in 1954.

See also 
 Choriocarcinoma
 Chorioangioma
 Herpes
 Nuclear atypia
 Nuclear pleomorphism 
Molar ectopic

References

Bibliography 
 Textbook of Obstetrics by D.C. Dutta Page no. 180. 

Mammal female reproductive system